London Canal Museum in the King's Cross area of London, England, is a regional museum devoted to the history of London's canals.

History
The museum was opened in 1992. It is housed in a Victorian ice warehouse that was used by Carlo Gatti. The building was constructed between 1862 and 1863 to house ice imported from Norway by ship and canal barge. There are two preserved ice wells under the building, one of which may be viewed from the public area of the museum.

Exhibitions and activities
The museum covers all aspects of the UK's waterways. The main exhibitions in the museum cover the following topics:
 Carlo Gatti and the ice trade
 Social history of canal workers
 Lifting and handling
 The decorative arts of the canals known as "roses and castles"
 Water and Locks - canal engineering
 Boats and Cargoes
 Methods of traction by horses, internal combustion engines, and miniature tractors
 History of the London canals

The museum runs guided trips through the Islington Tunnel. In addition the museum sponsors two boats at the National Waterways Museum, Ferret and Ilkeston, that are part of the national collection.

Location
The museum is situated in the King's Cross area of London, on the Regent's Canal. Battlebridge Basin is accessible from the rear of the museum. It is a five-minute walk to King's Cross St Pancras tube station.

See also
British Waterways
London Transport Museum
The Canal Museum

References

External links

 

Museums established in 1992
Museum, London Canal
Transport museums in London
Canal museums in England
Museums in the London Borough of Islington
Kings Cross, London